Olga Vladimirovna Strazheva (born 12 November 1972) is a retired gymnast from Ukraine who won world and Olympic gold medals for the Soviet Union.

She competed at the 1988 Summer Olympics. In the optional team final, she suffered a torn ACL on the balance beam and therefore was unable to compete on the final event, floor exercise, or attend the gold medal ceremony.

She won another gold with the Soviet team at the 1989 World Artistic Gymnastics Championships, along with two individual bronze medals. The same year she collected two more individual medals at the European championships. She is the first female gymnast to perform a double frontal salto on the floor.

She retired in 1990 due to injuries and later joined a circus company in Germany, where she performed together with her daughter Anna, a rhythmic gymnast. She married twice, second time in 2008 to Ivan Vanyuk, a colleague from the university where she teaches physical education.

References

1972 births
Living people
Soviet female artistic gymnasts
Gymnasts at the 1988 Summer Olympics
Olympic gymnasts of the Soviet Union
Olympic gold medalists for the Soviet Union
Olympic medalists in gymnastics
Sportspeople from Zaporizhzhia
Ukrainian female artistic gymnasts
Honoured Masters of Sport of the USSR
Medalists at the 1988 Summer Olympics
Medalists at the World Artistic Gymnastics Championships